Boca Juniors basketball section is part of the Boca Juniors sports club based in Buenos Aires, Argentina. The team plays in the Liga Nacional de Básquet (LNB), the first division of the Argentine league system. Boca's home games are played at the Estadio Luis Conde, also called the Bombonerita (in English: "Small Bombonera"), as a reference to the club's football stadium known as the La Bombonera.

Boca was one of the most successful teams before the creation of the LNB, winning many titles such as the Torneo Oficial, Torneo Apertura and Torneo Metropolitano organized by defunct leagues Federación Argentina and Asociación de Buenos Aires.

Since the establishment of the LNB in 1985, Boca has won three championships (in 1996–97, 2003–04, and 2006–07) and was runner-up another three times (1997–98, 2002–03, and 2004–05). Moreover, Boca won the first five editions of the Copa Argentina de Básquetbol (2002, 2003, 2004, 2005, and 2006) and the Torneo Top 4 in 2004. At the international level, the team has won three times the Campeonato Sudamericano de Clubes (2004, 2005, and 2006).

History

The beginning
The basketball section of Boca Juniors was created in 1929, requesting affiliation to the association but it was rejected. In 1930 the club could be registered to Federación Argentina de Básquet (the body that governed basketball in Argentina by then) but only junior teams took part of the competitions. The good results encouraged the club to continue participating in the league. In 1934 the team debuted at second division finishing second.

In 1936 a dissident association, the "Asociación de Básquet de Buenos Aires" was created. This organized its own championships from 1936 to 1973 when it would later merge with the Federación Argentina again. Boca played the tournaments held by the ABBA becoming one of the most successful teams during the decades of the 1940s, 1950s and 1960s.

On 27 November 1938 Boca Juniors played United States' team Amateur Athletic Union at the Luna Park of Buenos Aires. Boca won the match 38-33 being the first victory achieved by an Argentine basketball team over a North American side. The line-up was José Giuliano, Víctor Di Vita, Pedro Aizcorbe, Carlos Stropiana y Roberto Contini.

The "all-star" team
During the decade of the 1940s, Boca played in the Torneo Apertura (organized by the ABA) and then in the Torneo Metropolitano (since 1951) where the best ranked teams from both leagues, ABA and FBA, took part.

During the decade of 1940, Boca was nicknamed "el equipo de las estrellas" ("the all-stars team" in Spanish). During those years Boca won the 1938 and 1939 Apertura championships and the Campeonato Oficial in 1940 and 1941, all of them organized by the ABBA. The roster was: Pedro Aizcorbe, Daniel Anglés, Elías Bissio, Roberto Contini, Alberto Dayán, Víctor Di Vita, José Giuliano, Carlos Induni, Felipe Mattianich, Mario Mattioni, Pedro Rodríguez and Carlos Stroppiana. Nevertheless, Boca did not got any other championship until middle of the 1950s.

In 1951 a new championship, "Torneo Metropolitano" was created. This competition joined teams from both rival leagues, Federación Argentina and Asociación de Buenos Aires. To form a more competitive team, Boca hired Rosarian players Enrique Borda and Bernardo Schime, then acquiring Rubén Petrilli. Andrés Naranjito Rossi was the coach. Despite having lost the first six games, Boca finished in the 4th position in the 1955 tournament. In 1957, with the addition of notable players such as José Olivera, José Novoa and Luis Pérez, Boca won the 1957 and 1959 Metropolitano championships and was runner-up in 1958. The team was also runner-up in 1958 and 1958.

After the tenure of Rossi as coach, Abelardo Dasso replaced him. Under his coaching, Boca Juniors achieved its most significant success, winning during 3 consecutive years (1961, 1962 and 1963) all the tournaments disputed: the Oficial, Apertura and Metropolitano championships. During that period, the squad played a total of 93 games, winning 89.

Boca Juniors continued with his successful path, winning also the 1964 Apertura and the 1965, 1966 and 1967 Oficial championships.

Boca won another Metropolitano title in 1969 and the Oficial championship in 1970, defeating Lanús by 91–76 at River Plate arena. The most frequent line-up was Juan Carlos Mazzini, Néstor Delguy, Adalberto Gusso, Emilio Dumani, Juan Tito, Jesús Díaz, with Enrique Borda as coach.

Liga Nacional titles

Boca played the 1984 season, the last before the creation of Liga Nacional de Básquet, although the severe crisis of the club by then caused the team went off the competition few days before the beginning of the tournament. Boca made an effort to play in the second division in 1986 but the association did not allow the team to participate so Boca had to play at the last division, the Regional C. The team promoted to Liga B that same year.

In 1988 Boca promoted to Liga A, where the team debuted one year later. Boca Juniors did not make a good campaign so it was relegated to Liga B, where the team promoted again in 1990. At the top level again, in 1996 Boca Juniors inaugurated its first stadium built specifically for the practise of basketball, then named "Luis Conde" (mostly known as "La Bombonerita") in honour of a recently dead manager of the club. That same year Boca won its first title in the Liga Nacional (defeating Independiente (GP) at the finals. The team roster was: Byron Wilson, Jerome Mincy, Ariel Bernardini, Luis Villar, Sebastián Festa, Gabriel Fernández, Claudio Farabello, Gustavo Fernández, Diego Prego, Claudio Chiappero, Sebastián Acosta, Esteban Acosta, Fernando Oyarzún and Ariel Eslava. Julio Lamas was the coach.

That first achievement in the modern era would be succeeded by a second championship in 2003–04 (being its rival at the finals Gimnasia y Esgrima (LP)). The successful era continued, winning its third title in 2006–07 against Peñarol (MdP). Apart from the domestic league, Boca disputed the Copa Argentina de Básquetbol, winning the title in 2002 (inaugural season), 2003, 2004, 2005 and 2006 (five consecutive times). At international level, Boca won three Campeonato Sudamericano de Clubes in 2004, 2005 and 2006 (three consecutive achievements).

For the 2009–10 season, Boca signed a sponsorship agreement with the Chaco based AeroChaco airlines, that contributed US$500,000 to the club's professional basketball team. As part of the agreement, Boca played in the Liga Nacional under the name "AeroChaco Boca Juniors", and also played some of its matches in the city of Resistencia.

Players

Current roster 
2022–23 season

Honours

Domestic
 Torneo Apertura (6): 1938, 1939, 1961, 1962, 1963, 1964
 Campeonato Oficial (7): 1961, 1962, 1963, 1965, 1966, 1967, 1970
 Torneo Metropolitano (6): 1957, 1959, 1961, 1962, 1963, 1969
 Liga Nacional de Básquet (3): 1996–97, 2003–04, 2006–07
 Copa Argentina (5): 2002, 2003, 2004, 2005, 2006
 Torneo Top 4 (1): 2004

International
 Sudamericano de Clubes (3): 2004, 2005, 2006

Notes

References

External links

 
 Basquet on SoyBoca
 Basquet on Planeta Boca Juniors
 Boca Juniors on Pick and Roll

 
Basketball teams in Argentina
1929 establishments in Argentina
Basketball teams in Buenos Aires
Basketball teams established in 1929